Hylomyscus vulcanorum is a species of rodent in the family Muridae.

References

vulcanorum
Mammals described in 1925